Marcus Stergiopoulos (born 12 June 1974 in Melbourne) is an Australian of ethnic Greek descent. He is an association football player who plays as a midfielder.

Stergiopoulos signed for English club Lincoln City in August 2000. He scored once for the club, in a League Cup tie against Sheffield United, before leaving in November 2000.

References

External links
Lincoln City F.C. Official Archive Profile
Unofficial Marcus Stergiopoulos Profile at The Forgotten Imp

1974 births
Living people
Soccer players from Melbourne
Australian people of Greek descent
Australian expatriate soccer players
Expatriate footballers in Malaysia
APIA Leichhardt FC players
Carlton S.C. players
Football Kingz F.C. players
Lincoln City F.C. players
South Melbourne FC players
Sydney United 58 FC players
Expatriate footballers in Brunei
Brunei (Malaysia Premier League team) players
Association football midfielders
Gippsland Falcons players
Australian soccer players